The Federal Public Planning Service Science Policy or Belgian Science Policy Office, Federal Science Policy, known by the acronym BELSPO, is the federal government body responsible for research policy in Belgium. It designs and implements research programmes and networks and manages the participation of Belgium in European and international organisations. BELSPO supervises Belgian federal scientific organisations.

History
Formal political and administrative coordination of the Belgian science policy was begun with the creation of the first government organisations in 1959. These included the Interministerial Commission for Science Policy (ICSP) and the National Council for Science Policy (NCSP). In 1968, the Science Policy Office (SPO) was established as a Belgian State administration.

BELSPO was previously known as the Office for Scientific, Technical and Cultural Affairs (OSTC), which name was changed following the Copernic reform of Belgium's federal administration.

Federal scientific and cultural institutions
 Royal Belgian Institute for Space Aeronomy
 Belgian Co-ordinated Collections of Micro-organisms
 Sciensano
 Center for Historical Research and Documentation on War and Contemporary Society 
 Geological Survey of Belgium
 National and Provincial State Archives (State Archives in Belgium)
 Planetarium
 Royal Belgian Institute of Natural Sciences
 Royal Institute for Cultural Heritage
 Royal Library of Belgium 
 Royal Meteorological Institute
 Royal Museum for Central Africa
 Royal Museums for Art and History
 Royal Museums of Fine Arts of Belgium 
 Royal Observatory of Belgium

Federal scientific and cultural partner institutions

 Academia Belgica at Rome 
 Euro Space Center
 Royal Academy of Overseas Sciences
 Cinematek 
 Von Karman Institute for Fluid Dynamics

See also
 Science and technology in Belgium
 Science and technology in the Brussels-Capital Region
 Science and technology in Flanders
 Science and technology in Wallonia
 Belgian Academy Council of Applied Sciences (BACAS)
 Francqui Foundation
 National Fund for Scientific Research
 Agoria

References
 BELSPO

External links
 
 Belgian Portal for Research and Innovation 
 Presentation of R&D policies in Belgium (European Commission website, ERAWATCH) 
 Presentation of innovation policies in Belgium (European Commission website, ProInno TrendChart for Innovation)

Scientific organisations based in Belgium
Science and technology in Belgium
Federal departments and agencies of Belgium
Government agencies of Belgium
Science and technology ministries
Organizations with year of establishment missing